Sergio Ciani (7 September 1931 – 5 September 2015), best known as Alan Steel, was an Italian bodybuilder and actor.

Born in Rome, Ciani started his career as a stuntman; then he became the body double for Steve Reeves in Hercules Unchained and in The Giant of Marathon, in which he also played a minor role. In the early 1960s he adopted the stage name Alan Steel and starred the leading roles in a number of peplum films with good commercial success. He had the distinction as being one of the very few native Italians to play the heroes of the peplum features. In addition to playing roles named either Hercules, Ursus, or Samson, he played Robin Hood in the 1976 adventure film Storia di arcieri, pugni e occhi neri. With the decline of the genre Steel thinned out his appearances, until his retirement at the end of the 1970s. 

Ciani died in his sleep at his house in Ostia, Rome, at age 79, just two days short of what would have been his 80th birthday.

Partial filmography  

 Herod the Great (1958) as Palace Guard (uncredited)
 Hercules Unchained (1959) as Megreo
 The Giant of Marathon (1959) as Euros
 Samson (1961) as Macigno aka Hercules
 The Fury of Hercules (1962) as Kaldos
 The Rebel Gladiators (1962) as Commodus
 The Old Testament (1962)
 Samson and the Slave Queen (1963) as Samson (in U.S. version) / Maciste
 Hercules and the Masked Rider (1963) as Golia / Paco / Hercules
 Hercules and the Black Pirates (1964) as Samson
 Hercules Against Rome (1964) as Ercole
 Hercules Against the Moon Men (1964) as Maciste / Hercules
 Hercules and the Treasure of the Incas (1964) as William Smith / Samson
 Samson and His Mighty Challenge (1964) as Hercules
 3 Avengers (1964) as Ursus
 A... For Assassin (1966) as Giacomo
 Un colpo da re (1967) as The Swede
 Addio mamma (1967) as Franco Rinaldi, Patrizia's husband
 Sapevano solo uccidere (1968) as Pedro
 La furia dei Khyber (1970) as Capitano Miller
 Fasthand (1973) as Cpt. Jeff Madison
 The Little Cowboy (1973) as Monty Donovan
 Dagli archivi della polizia criminale (1973) as Larry Brenton
 Storia di arcieri, pugni e occhi neri (1976) as Robin Hood
 Korkusuz cengaver (1976) as Korsan (uncredited)
 Io tigro, tu tigri, egli tigra (1978)
 Baby Love (1979) (final film role)

References

External links

1931 births
2015 deaths
20th-century Italian male actors
Italian bodybuilders
Italian male film actors
Male actors from Rome
People associated with physical culture